The 2000 WNBA season was the 4th season for the Utah Starzz. The team finished the season with a winning record, but fell short for the WNBA Playoffs, falling two games back to the Phoenix Mercury.

Off-season
Debbie Black was selected by the Miami Sol, while Chantel Tremitiere was picked by the Indiana Fever in the 2000 WNBA Expansion Draft.

WNBA Draft

Trades

Regular season

Season standings

Season schedule

Player stats

References

Utah Starzz seasons
Utah
Utah Starzz